Jazireh Rural District is in Ilkhchi District of Osku County, East Azerbaijan province, Iran. At the National Census of 2006, its population was 3,574 in 1,047 households. There were 3,014 inhabitants in 1,058 households at the following census of 2011. At the most recent census of 2016, the population of the rural district was 2,499 in 967 households. The largest of its seven villages was Saray Deh, with 927 people.

References 

Osku County

Rural Districts of East Azerbaijan Province

Populated places in East Azerbaijan Province

Populated places in Osku County